Hansan Assembly constituency is an assembly constituency in Birbhum district in the Indian state of West Bengal.

Overview
As per orders of the Delimitation Commission, No. 292 Hansan  Assembly constituency is composed of the following: Rampurhat II and Nalhati II CD Blocks.

Hansan Assembly constituency is part of No. 42 Birbhum (Lok Sabha constituency).

Election results

2021

2011
In the 2011 election, Asit Kumar Mal of Congress defeated his nearest rival Kamal Hasan of RCPI.

1977–2006
From 1996 to 2006, Asit Kumar Mal of Congress was elected from the Hansan (SC) assembly constituency. He defeated Khagendranath Mal of CPI(M) in 2006, Mihir Bain of RCPI(R) in 2001 and 1996. Contests in most years were multi cornered but only winners and runners are being mentioned. Trilochan Das of RCPI (RB) defeated Asit Kumar Mal of Congress in 1991. Asit Kumar Mal of Congress defeated Trilochan Mal, Independent in 1987. Trilochan Das, Independent/RCPI, defeated Asit Kumar Mal Congress/Independent in 1982 and 1977.

1962–1972
Dhanapati Mal of Congress won in 1972. Trilochan Mal of RCI won in 1971. Mrityunjoy Mandal of Forward Bloc won in 1969. S.Prasad of Congress won in 1967. Prior to that the Hansan seat was not there.

References

Assembly constituencies of West Bengal
Politics of Birbhum district